Zvone Černač (born 23 October 1962) is a Slovenian politician. , he is Minister without portfolio for Development and European Cohesion Policy in the 14th Government of Slovenia.

References 

Living people
1962 births
Place of birth missing (living people)
21st-century Slovenian politicians
Ministers without portfolio of Slovenia